Adam Stockhausen is an American production designer known for his collaborations with Wes Anderson, Steven Spielberg, and Steve McQueen. He's received four nominations for the Academy Award for Best Production Design winning for The Grand Budapest Hotel (2014).

Early life and education  
Stockhausen grew up in Wauwatosa, Wisconsin and graduated with a Theater Arts degree from Marquette University's Diederich College of Communication in 1995, and a Master of Fine Arts from the Yale School of Drama in 1999.

Career 
Stockhausen, along with set decorator Anna Pinnock won the Academy Award for Best Production Design for the 2014 film The Grand Budapest Hotel. Previously he was nominated for the Academy Award for Best Production Design for the 2013 film 12 Years a Slave together with set decorator Alice Baker. He was also nominated for the Academy Award for Best Production Design for the 2015 film Bridge of Spies along with set decorators Bernhard Henrich and Rena DeAngelo.

Filmography
As production designer

As art director

Awards and nominations

References

External links 

Living people
American production designers
Best Art Direction Academy Award winners
Best Production Design BAFTA Award winners
Marquette University alumni
People from Brookfield, Wisconsin
Place of birth missing (living people)
Yale School of Drama alumni
Year of birth missing (living people)